The Democratic Federation of Labour (FDT) is a national trade union center in Morocco. It was formed in April 2003 as a breakaway from the Democratic Confederation of Labour (CDT).

References

External links
 FDT website.

Trade unions in Morocco
Trade unions established in 2003